Charles Forster may refer to:
 Sir Charles Forster, 1st Baronet (1815–1891), English Liberal politician 
 Charles Smith Forster (1786–1850), English banker and Conservative politician 
 Charles French Blake-Forster (1851–1874), Irish writer 
 Charles Farrar Forster (1848–1894), British vicar

See also
 Charles Foster (disambiguation)